1M or 1-M may refer to:

1m or 1 metre
1M as one million
Dinas Rekani
Astra 1M satellite
Mars 1M spacecraft
Northrop N-1M, an American experimental aircraft
Globus-1M No.12L, a Russian military communications satellite
UH-1M, model of Bell UH-1 Iroquois
TAC-1M, variant of the semi-automatic carbine Demro TAC-1
SPP-1M, a variant of the SPP-1 underwater pistol
PDM-1M mine, a variant of the PDM series of amphibious mines
VO-1M, an early designation of the Marine Attack Squadron VMA-231
YaK-1M, a variant of the Yakovlev Yak-1
SSH 1M (WA), an early name of Washington State Route 121
BWP-1M, a BMP-1 variant
BMW 1M, a BMW 1 Series M Coupe

See also
M1 (disambiguation)
LM (disambiguation)
IM (disambiguation)